Matt Fagerson (born 16 July 1998) is a Scotland international rugby union player who plays for Glasgow Warriors as a back row.

Rugby Union career

Amateur career

Fagerson played for the great Dundee Eagles at junior rugby level. Fagerson attended the High School of Dundee and Strathallan School and played for the Caledonia U18 district side.

When not in Warriors duty, Fagerson plays for Glasgow Hawks.

Professional career

Fagerson enrolled in the BT Sport Scottish Rugby Academy in 2015-16 as a Stage 2 player. In 2016-17 he was promoted to Stage 3 earning a full time professional contract with the Academy. Stage 3 players are assigned to a professional club and Fagerson has been assigned to Glasgow Warriors for the 2016-17 season.

Fagerson made his debut for the Warriors in the pre-season match against Canada 'A' on 30 August 2016. In a 63–0 win for the Warriors, Fagerson scored a try on his debut.

Fagerson made his Pro12 debut for the Warriors against Ulster on 23 September 2016 when he replaced Ryan Wilson.

Fagerson signed a professional contract with the Warriors on 28 September 2017, turning professional on 1 October 2017. The contract runs for two and a half years meaning that Fagerson has committed to the club until at least 2020.

International career

Fagerson has represented Scotland Under 16s and Scotland Under 18s.

Fagerson gained his first senior  cap for Scotland on 16 June 2018 when playing against the United States.

He was capped by Scotland 'A' on 25 June 2022 in their match against Chile.

Family

He is the younger brother of Scotland international rugby union player Zander Fagerson.

References

External links
 
 Glasgow v Ulster preview, The Courier
 Glasgow v Canada 'A' match report, Americas Rugby News

1998 births
Living people
Glasgow Hawks players
Glasgow Warriors players
People educated at Strathallan School
People educated at the High School of Dundee
Rugby union flankers
Rugby union players from Perth, Scotland
Scotland international rugby union players
Scottish rugby union players
Howe of Fife RFC players
Scotland 'A' international rugby union players